Justin Graeme Douglas Hulford (born 1971) is a British author, poet and reviewer.

Biography

Hulford attended Hampton School. During that time he began writing in a range of media including poetry, fiction and role playing games.

After publishing in two poetry anthologies Hulford started researching a range of subjects for novels.  As time passed he contributed to the printed magazines "Corduroy" and "Powerplay" before being signed to "The Rocktologist" online webzine.  Somewhere within this he created the online webzine "Beyond" focusing on UK progressive metal band Threshold.  More recently he began contributing reviews of live music to "Through The Wire" and "Antichrist".

Hulford has also launched his own written word promotions company called OnTheRail Promotions, launched a radio show called The Rock Show on Generate Radio based in Duns, Berwickshire, and then had his first novel published, "Tolosa Gold".  This was followed by a poetry anthology, "Bitter Twists" and a non-fiction gazetteer of "British Battlefields – A Chronology", before novel "My Father's Feet" in 2018.

Works
Hulford has an extensive portfolio of reviews, interviews and articles.

Poetry

Christ Knows Why (poem) in Mixed Blessings
Question Of Faith (poem) in Seeds Of Wisdom
Bitter Twists (collection) published October 2012

Corduroy

Corduroy Issue 4 – An Introduction To Whisky and Review of The Yew Tree at Cauldon
Corduroy Issue 5 – An Introduction To Whisky Part II
Corduroy Issue 6 – Cheese
Corduroy Issue 7 – Cheese Part II
Corduroy Issue 8 – Pertinent Points contribution, Theakstons and The Return of the Grand Tour (about Rome)
Corduroy Unpublished due to magazine closing – Taxidermy, Honey and A History Of Port

The Rocktologist

Lead reviewer since its inception in January 2011 (all published on own site too).  To date this has included up to 30 reviews per month and numerous interviews, with over 1450 articles to date.

Through The Wire

Live reviewer since August 2014.

Non Fiction

British Battles – A Chronology, first published in 2015, followed by a revised second edition in 2018.  This book aims to list all the battles, sieges, skirmishes and more that have been fought in Britain, in chronological order.

Novels

Tolosa Gold – a novel published 2012
My Father's Feet – a novel published 2018

Beyond

An online webzine all about the British progressive metal band, Threshold.  Now in its twelfth issue.

Other credits

Development and proof reading for Who Shares Your Problem? by Neil Henson
English subtitles and proof reading for 20 Years Of Avoiding A Job (Damian Wilson)
The Trip issue 2 (review Winter in Eden), and The Trip issue 3 (review Bruce Springsteen live)
Numerous biographies for bands and website content edits (For All We Know, Acelsia, Vanderbuyst, Maiden United and many more)

Justin Hulford

Prior to its publication with The Rocktologist, all material is also first published on Hulford's own site.  A number of items predate January 2011 and appeared exclusively on Hulford's own site, including reviews of books, plays and restaurants.

External links 
  British Battles – A Chronology
  home of The Rocktologist
  home of the Rock Show
  Tolosa Gold, a novel
  personal home page for reviews
  home of Beyond
  home of Through The Wire

1971 births
Living people
People educated at Hampton School
British poets
British male poets